Fairfield Township is one of the nineteen townships of Huron County, Ohio, United States. As of the 2010 census the population of the township was 1,218, of whom 658 lived in the unincorporated portion of the township.

Geography
Located in the center of the county, it borders the following townships:
Norwalk Township - north
Townsend Township - northeast corner
Hartland Township - east
Fitchville Township - southeast corner
Ripley Township - south
Greenfield Township - southwest corner
Peru Township - west
Ridgefield Township - northwest corner

The village of North Fairfield is located in western Fairfield Township.

Name and history
Fairfield Township was organized in 1823. It was named after Fairfield, Connecticut, the hometown of many of its pioneer settlers.

It is one of seven Fairfield Townships statewide.

Government
The township is governed by a three-member board of trustees, who are elected in November of odd-numbered years to a four-year term beginning on the following January 1. Two are elected in the year after the presidential election and one is elected in the year before it. There is also an elected township fiscal officer, who serves a four-year term beginning on April 1 of the year after the election, which is held in November of the year before the presidential election. Vacancies in the fiscal officership or on the board of trustees are filled by the remaining trustees.

References

External links
County website

Townships in Huron County, Ohio
Townships in Ohio